The Heart of the Man is the debut studio album by singer Phil Perry issued in 1991 on Capitol Records. The album peaked at No. 17 on the Billboard Top R&B Albums chart.

Track listing

Charts

Weekly charts

Year-end charts

References

1991 debut albums
Capitol Records albums
albums produced by George Duke